Hughan Edwardo Gray (born 25 March 1987) is a Jamaican international footballer who plays for Waterhouse, as a right back.

Career
Gray has played club football for Sporting Central Academy and Waterhouse.

He made his international debut for Jamaica in 2014.

References

1987 births
Living people
Jamaican footballers
Jamaica international footballers
Association football fullbacks
Sporting Central Academy players
Waterhouse F.C. players
2014 Caribbean Cup players
2015 Copa América players